The Asia/Oceania Zone was one of the three zones of the regional Davis Cup competition in 1997.

In the Asia/Oceania Zone there were four different tiers, called groups, in which teams compete against each other to advance to the upper tier. Winners in Group II advanced to the Asia/Oceania Zone Group I. Teams who lost their respective ties competed in the relegation play-offs, with winning teams remaining in Group II, whereas teams who lost their play-offs were relegated to the Asia/Oceania Zone Group III in 1998.

Participating nations

Draw

 and  relegated to Group III in 1998.
 promoted to Group I in 1998.

First round

Chinese Taipei vs. Singapore

Pakistan vs. Iran

Saudi Arabia vs. Lebanon

Hong Kong vs. Thailand

Second round

Iran vs. Chinese Taipei

Lebanon vs. Thailand

Relegation play-offs

Pakistan vs. Singapore

Saudi Arabia vs. Hong Kong

Third round

Lebanon vs. Iran

References

External links
Davis Cup official website

Davis Cup Asia/Oceania Zone
Asia Oceania Zone Group II